Taranidaphne is a genus of sea snails, marine gastropod mollusks in the family Raphitomidae.

Species
Species within the genus Taranidaphne include:
 Taranidaphne amphitrites (Melvill & Standen, 1903)
 Taranidaphne beblammena (Sturany, 1903) 
 Taranidaphne dufresnei Morassi & Bonfitto, 2001
 Taranidaphne hongkongensis (Sowerby III, 1889)
 Taranidaphne nereidum (Melvill & Standen, 1903)

References

 Bouchet P., Kantor Yu.I., Sysoev A. & Puillandre N. (2011) A new operational classification of the Conoidea. Journal of Molluscan Studies 77: 273-308.

External links
 
 Worldwide Mollusc Species Data Base: Raphitomidae
 Morassi, M.; Bonfitto, A. (2001). Taranidaphne dufresnei (Mollusca: Gastropoda: Turridae), new genus and species from Yemen, Red Sea. The Veliger. 44: 66-72

 
Raphitomidae
Gastropod genera